Caucnemastoma is a genus of harvestmen in the family Nemastomatidae with 2 described species from Russia.

Species
There are currently 2 described species in the genus Caucnemastoma:

Caucnemastoma golovatchi Martens, 2006  Krasnodar Krai, Adygea, and Karachay-Cherkessia, Russia
Caucnemastoma martensi Segovaya, 2011  Krasnodar Krai, Russia

References

Harvestman genera
Arachnids of Europe